Crime, Inc. is a 1945 American film noir crime film directed by Lew Landers starring Leo Carrillo, Tom Neal and Martha Tilton.

Plot summary

The film, based on a story by former crime reporter Martin Mooney, is about a newspaper journalist who faces prison time because he refuses to name his sources. To complicate matters more, the reporter falls in love with the sister of one of the racketeers he's trying to take down.

Cast
 Leo Carrillo as Anthony Charles "Tony" Marlow
 Tom Neal as Jim Riley
 Martha Tilton as Betty Van Cleve,  Betty Egan
 Lionel Atwill as Pat Coyle
 Grant Mitchell as Wayne Clark
 Sheldon Leonard as Capt. Ferrone
 Harry Shannon as Police Commissioner Collins
 Danny Morton as Bugs Kelley a.k.a. Mike Egan
 Virginia Vale as Trixie Waters
 Don Beddoe as Deputy District Attorney Dixon
 George Meeker as Barry North
 Rod Rogers as Henchman Val Lucas

Soundtrack
Martha Tilton - "I'm Guilty" (Written by Jay Livingston and Ray Evans)
Martha Tilton - "Lonely Little Camera Girl" (Written by Jay Livingston and Ray Evans)
Martha Tilton - "What a Fool I Was" (Written by Marla Shelton and Nacio Porter Brown as Nacio Porter Brown Jr.)
"That's It" (Written by Marla Shelton and Nacio Porter Brown as Nacio Porter Brown Jr.)

External links
 
 

1945 films
American crime drama films
1945 crime drama films
1940s English-language films
American black-and-white films
Films directed by Lew Landers
Producers Releasing Corporation films
American crime thriller films
1940s crime thriller films
1940s American films